Mother is a 2009 South Korean thriller film directed by Bong Joon-ho, starring Kim Hye-ja and Won Bin. The plot follows a mother who, after her intellectually disabled son is accused of the murder of a young girl, attempts to find the true killer in order to get her son freed.

The film premiered on 16 May 2009 at the Cannes Film Festival in the Un Certain Regard section, and was released in South Korea on 28 May 2009. It received critical acclaim from critics, who praised Kim's performance, the direction and screenplay, and the film's uniqueness.

Plot
An unnamed widow lives alone with her only son, selling medicinal herbs in a small town in southern South Korea while conducting unlicensed acupuncture treatments for the town's women on the side to erase bad memories. Her son, Yoon Do-joon, is shy, but prone to attacking anyone who mocks his intellectual disability. She dotes on him and scolds him for hanging out with Jin-tae, a local thug. When Do-joon is nearly hit by a car, he and Jin-tae vandalize the car and attack the driver and passengers as revenge. Jin-tae blames Do-joon for the damage done to the car, and Do-joon is sued. His mother struggles with the burden of the debt.

On his way home from a bar late at night, Do-joon sees a high school girl named Moon Ah-jung walking alone and follows her to an abandoned building. The next morning, she is discovered dead on the rooftop, shocking the town and pressuring the incompetent police to find the killer. Do-joon is arrested for the murder due to circumstantial evidence placing him near the scene of the crime. His mother believes he is innocent, and tries to prove he is not the murderer. However, she is challenged by her self-absorbed lawyer and the community who unanimously blames Do-joon for the crime.

Suspecting Jin-tae of committing the murder, the mother breaks into his house to look for evidence. She takes a golf club, which she believes has blood on it, but when she turns it over to the police and Jin-tae is confronted about it, it becomes clear that the "blood" is just smeared lipstick. Despite her accusation, Jin-tae agrees to help the mother solve the case for a fee.

When the mother questions the people in town about Ah-jung, they tell her the girl was sexually promiscuous and in a relationship with a boy known as Jong-pal, who had escaped a sanatorium. Do-joon attacks another prisoner who calls him "retard". On one of his mother's prison visits, Do-joon recalls a memory of her attempt to kill him and then herself when he was five by lacing their drinks with a pesticide. She tries to apologize, saying she wanted to free them both from hardship, but he tells her he never wants to see her again.

The mother learns from a camera-shop worker that Ah-jung had frequent nosebleeds and had pictures on her cellphone that she wanted to have printed. Ah-jung's friend is attacked by two young men who are looking for the phone, but the mother rescues her and then pays Jin-tae to interrogate the men, who claim that Ah-jung accepted rice in exchange for sex (and was nicknamed "the rice cake girl"). They say she used her phone to secretly take pictures of her partners, thus making it a potential tool for blackmailing. The mother tracks down the phone, which is hidden at Ah-jung's grandmother's house.

Do-joon remembers seeing an elderly man in the abandoned building on the night of Ah-jung's death and identifies him in one of the pictures on Ah-jung's phone. The mother recognizes the man as a junk collector she once bought an umbrella from and goes to his home to find out what he saw, on the pretense of offering him charity medical services. The collector reveals that he has been troubled since he saw Do-joon kill Ah-jung. He witnessed the two have a short conversation, during which Ah-jung called Do-joon a "retard", and Do-joon then threw a large rock into the shadows in which Ah-jung was standing, hitting her in the head and inadvertently killing her, and then dragged her to the rooftop. Unable to accept the truth, the mother frantically tells the collector that Do-joon is innocent, but the collector picks up the phone to finally report what he had seen to the police. Fearing for her son, the mother bludgeons the collector with a wrench and sets fire to his house.

Later, the police tell the mother that they have found the "real" killer: Jong-pal, who is being presumed guilty after Ah-jung's blood was found on his shirt. The police assume it got there during the murder, but the mother realizes that Jong-pal's story, that the blood is the result of Ah-jung's nose bleeding during consensual sex, is true. Feeling guilty, she visits Jong-pal, who is even more intellectually disabled than her son, and cries for him when she hears he does not have a mother to fight for him, knowing he is going to jail for a crime he did not commit.

Do-joon is freed from prison and Jin-tae picks him up. They pass the collector's burned-down house on the way home and stop to pick through the rubble. During dinner, Do-joon muses to his mother that Jong-pal probably dragged Ah-jung up to the roof so that someone would see she was hurt and help her. As the mother is about to depart from a bus station on a "Thank-You Parents" tour, Do-joon returns her acupuncture kit, which he found in the remains of the junk collector's house, and tells her to be more careful. Jarred by his discovery, she sits on the bus in shock before using the kit to blank out the memory of her son's guilty crime.

Cast
 Kim Hye-ja as Mother, an unnamed widow who is extremely protective of her son and attempts to free him from a murder charge
 Won Bin as Yoon Do-joon, the adult son of Mother, who has an intellectual disability and is accused of the murder of a local girl
 Jin Goo as Jin-tae, a local ne'er do well and one of Do-joon's friends. He bosses Do-joon around, but agrees to help Mother free her son.
 Yoon Je-moon as Je-moon, the detective in charge of Ah-jung's murder case
 Jeon Mi-seon as Mi-seon, a camera-shop worker who helps Mother. She had met Ah-jung before she died.
 Song Sae-byeok as a detective
 Lee Young-suk as the junk collector
 Moon Hee-ra as Moon Ah-jung, a young girl who is murdered, leading the police to arrest Do-joon
 Chun Woo-hee as Mi-na, Jin-tae's girlfriend
 Kim Byung-Soon as the detective team leader
 Yeo Moo-Young as Do-joon's lawyer
 Lee Mi-do as Hyung-teo, Ah-jung's friend
 Kim Jin-goo as Ah-jung's grandma
 Lee Jung-eun as Ah-jung's relative with glasses
 Hwang Young-hee as Ah-jung's pregnant relative
 Kwak Do-won as charcoal fire man
 Ko Kyu-pil as Ddong Ddong

Release
Mother competed in the Un Certain Regard category at the 2009 Cannes Film Festival. The film had its U.S. premiere in February 2010 as part of the Santa Barbara International Film Festival, and it received a limited U.S. theatrical release by Magnolia Pictures in March 2010. In March 2015, the film was re-released in the US at the Jacob Burns Film Center in Pleasantville, New York, as part of their Bong Joon-ho Retrospective (along with Memories of Murder, The Host, and Snowpiercer). A black-and-white version of the film was released in 2013.

The film was reported to have been made with a $5 million budget and went on to be the sixth highest grossing film in South Korea in 2009.

Critical response
On review aggregator website Rotten Tomatoes, the film has an approval rating of 96% based on 114 reviews, with an average rating of 7.88/10. The site's critical consensus reads, "As fleshy as it is funny, Bong Joon-Ho's Mother straddles family drama, horror and comedy with a deft grasp of tone and plenty of eerie visuals." On Metacritic, which assigns a normalized rating to reviews, the film has a weighted average score of 79 out of 100 based on 31 critics, indicating "generally favorable reviews."

Manohla Dargis of The New York Times praised the performance by Kim Hye-ja and described the film as "alternately dazzling and frustrating".

Top ten lists

Mother appeared on many film critics' "best-of" lists of 2010.

 2nd – Reverse Shot
 2nd – Frank Paiva, MSN Movies
 4th – Noel Murray, The A.V. Club
 4th – Michael Atkinson, The Village Voice
 4th – Jim Emerson, MSN Movies
 5th – Slant Magazine
 7th – Kim Morgan, MSN Movies
 7th – Peter Hartlaub, San Francisco Chronicle
 8th – Keith Philipps, The A.V. Club
 8th – Scott Tobias, The A.V. Club
 10th – Tasha Robinson, The A.V. Club
 10th – Cahiers du cinéma
 Not ranked – Anthony Lane, The New Yorker
 Not ranked – Dana Stevens, Slant Magazine
 Not ranked – Joe Morgenstern, The Wall Street Journal

Adaptation 
The core plot of the 2022 Kannada film Love 360 directed by Shashank was inspired from this film.

Awards and nominations 
The film was selected as South Korea's official submission for the Academy Award for Best Foreign Language Film at the 82nd Academy Awards.

References

External links

 
 
 
 
 
 
 
 

2009 films
2009 drama films
2000s crime drama films
Films directed by Bong Joon-ho
Films with screenplays by Bong Joon-ho
Films set in South Korea
2000s Korean-language films
South Korean crime drama films
South Korean mystery films
Asian Film Award for Best Film winners
Best Picture Blue Dragon Film Award winners
South Korean thriller films
2000s South Korean films
Films about disability